Vlastimil Uchytil is an orienteering competitor who competed for Czechoslovakia. At the 1983 World Orienteering Championships in Zalaegerszeg he won a silver medal in the relay, together with Pavel Ditrych, Josef Pollák and Jaroslav Kacmarcik.

References

Year of birth missing (living people)
Living people
Czechoslovak orienteers
Male orienteers
Foot orienteers
World Orienteering Championships medalists